This is a list of Nigerian films released in 2008.

Films

See also
List of Nigerian films

References

External links
2008 films at the Internet Movie Database

2008
Lists of 2008 films by country or language
Films